Arna Mer-Khamis (20 March 1929 – 15 February 1995) was an Israeli Jewish political and human rights activist. In 1993, she was awarded the Right Livelihood Award for "passionate commitment to the defence and education of the children of Palestine."

Biography 
Arna Mer was born in 1929, in Rosh Pinna, at the time Mandate Palestine. Mer's father was Gideon Mer, a Lithuanian-born Jewish scientist who pioneered the study of malaria during the British Mandate. Mer fought with the Palmach and Israel Defense Forces during the 1948 Arab-Israeli War.

Mer married Saliba Khamis, a Christian Arab and a prominent member of Maki and had three sons: Spartacus, Juliano (who adopted the name Juliano Mer-Khamis), and Abir. Juliano, an actor, filmmaker, and peace activist who was murdered in 2011, directed the film Arna's Children about Mer's work with the Freedom Theatre.

Political activism
Mer was an active member of the Communist party in Israel. During the First Intifada, as part of a project to support the education of children in the West Bank, she established the organisation In the Defence of Children under Occupation/Care and Learning, and later established the Freedom Theatre in Jenin refugee camp.

Awards 
In 1993, Mer was awarded the Right Livelihood Award. In her acceptance speech, Arna Mer-Khamis expressed her sympathy for Palestinian refugee children and their sufferings.

References

External links 
 Right Livelihood Award Acceptance Speech
 Documentary by Explore: "No Child is Born a Terrorist"

1929 births
1995 deaths
Israeli human rights activists
Women human rights activists
20th-century Israeli Jews
Israeli people of Lithuanian-Jewish descent
Jewish socialists
Maki (historical political party) politicians
Palmach members
People from Rosh Pinna
Israeli female military personnel
Deaths from cancer in Israel
Israeli women activists